The South County car bomber was a person (or persons) who terrorized south St. Louis County, Missouri with a series of fatal car bombings in 1977.

Event
Two people – Shirley Marie Flynn and Robert Curtis Jackson – were killed in bombings on October 18, 1977 and November 3, 1977, respectively. A third victim, Ronald Sterghos, escaped injury in an earlier attack on October 7, 1977.

The bombings ceased after that and were never solved, despite an extensive effort by police. The bombings have been described as random, and some investigators believed that they were the work of a deranged individual. Some authorities have, however, noted similarities between the St. Louis County bombings and a car bombing on March 7, 1978 in Paducah, Kentucky in which William Ohlhausen, who had been Shirley Flynn's boyfriend, was seriously injured.

See also
List of fugitives from justice who disappeared
List of unsolved murders

Notes

1977 in Missouri
1977 murders in the United States
Bombers (people)
Car and truck bombings in the United States
Crime in St. Louis
Crimes in Missouri
History of St. Louis County, Missouri
Murder in Missouri
November 1977 crimes
November 1977 events in the United States
October 1977 crimes
October 1977 events in the United States
Unsolved murders in the United States

Unidentified serial killers
Serial bombers